Anuya Y Bhagwat is an Indian actress and model who has appeared in Tamil films. She is best known for her performances in Rajesh's Siva Manasula Sakthi (2009) and Shankar's Nanban (2012).

Film career 
Anuya Y Bhagvath debuted in the Hindi children's film Mahek, directed by Kranti Kanade. The film premiered at the London Film Festival and was critically acclaimed, gaining nominations in various categories including Best Picture at the WorldFest-Houston International Film Festival. Bhagvath's breakthrough came in her next film, Siva Manasula Sakthi (2009), a romantic comedy film directed by Rajesh, which featured her in a titular role alongside Jiiva. Before the film's release, she narrowly escaped from a terror attack while she was staying at a hotel in Mumbai.

Bhagvath next worked on a film titled Madurai Sambavam (2009) directed by Youreka, which was made on a small budget and set against the backdrop of Madurai. A reviewer from Sify wrote, "Anuya, in a deglamorised role as the fiendish cop who falls for the rowdy is fantastic. She brings so much emotion and reality to her performance and is an actress of substance". This helped her fetch a role in the film Nagaram opposite Sundar C, and further smaller roles in Vijay Antony's Naan (2012) and a promotional song in Nanjupuram (2011). After making a cameo appearance in S. Shankar's Nanban, she said that she will not be doing any such roles in future. Bhagvath then briefly worked in Bengali films and made a debut in a film titled Gora, based on a novel of the same name by Rabindranath Tagore. She later featured in the Doordarshan TV series, Ek Tha Rusty (2014), playing Maharani.

Later in 2017, Bhagvath participated in the first season of Bigg Boss Tamil, but became the first contestant to be evicted. She later claimed that her inability to speak Tamil fluently meant that other contestants were less accepting of her presence in the show.

Filmography

Television

References

External links 
 

Living people
People from Dubai
Indian expatriates in the United Arab Emirates
21st-century Indian actresses
Indian film actresses
Actresses in Tamil cinema
Female models from Mumbai
Film and Television Institute of India alumni
Actresses in Hindi cinema
Actresses in Bengali cinema
Bigg Boss (Tamil TV series) contestants
Year of birth missing (living people)